The 1947 Preakness Stakes was the 57th running of the $100,000 added Preakness Stakes, a horse race for three-year-old Thoroughbreds. The second leg of the U.S. Triple Crown series took place on May 10, 1947 and was run seven days after the 1947 Kentucky Derby. Ridden by Douglas Dodson, who was praised by the Daily Racing Form for a smart ride,  Faultless won the mile and three sixteenths race by one and a quarter lengths over runner-up On Trust with the betting favorite Phalanx in third. Jet Pilot, winner of the Kentucky Derby, finished fourth. The race was run on a track rated fast in a final time of 1:59 flat.

Payout 
The 57th Preakness Stakes Payout Schedule

The full chart 
1947 Preakess Stakes scheduled starters, jockeys, trainers, owners

 Winning breeder: Calumet Farm (KY)
 Times: 1/4 mile 0:23 2/5; 1/2 mile – 0:47 1/5; 3/4 mile – 1:12  1/5; mile – 1:39 1/5; 1 3/16 – 1:59 0/0.
 Track condition: fast

Clem McCarthy's Blunder
During the homestretch of the Preakness, radio broadcaster Clem McCarthy mistakenly called Jet Pilot the leader and eventually the winner until Clem made a big mistake, and later apologize to the radio audience and correctly named Faultless the winner.

References

External links 
 

1947
Pimlico Race Course
1947 in horse racing
1947 in American sports
1947 in sports in Maryland
Horse races in Maryland